The Thirteenth Chair is a 1929 American mystery film directed by Tod Browning. The picture is based on a 1916 play of the same name by Bayard Veiller. It stars Conrad Nagel, Leila Hyams and Margaret Wycherly.

The film was one of many released in both sound and silent versions. The initial television airing of the sound version was by TCM on August 22, 2019.

An earlier version of the film, starring Creighton Hale, was made in 1919 by ACME/ Pathe Exchange, directed by Leonce Perret. In 1937, the film was again remade by MGM under the same title starring Elissa Landi and Dame May Whitty.

Plot
Inspector Delzante (Bela Lugosi), investigates a pair of murders near a British mansion in Calcutta. Helen O'Neill (Leila Hyams) becomes a chief suspect based on circumstantial evidence. A fake Irish medium, Madame LaGrange (Margaret Wycherly) is called in to try to help solve the first murder.

Cast

Production
The Thirteenth Chair was director Tod Browning's first sound film. It was based on one of the most famous of the "old dark house" stage plays: Bayard Veiller's The Thirteenth Chair which debuted on Broadway on November 20, 1916. The play had previously been adpated as a silent film by Léonce Peret as The Thirteenth Chair

In late May 1929, MGM hired Margaret Wycherly to reprise her stage role as La Grange. Shortly after, Leila Hyams was also cast. For the leading role of Richard Crosby, the press has stated that Lon Chaney was offered the role but turned it down. The Hollywood Filmograph stated later that Joel McCrea would play Crosby, but Conrad Nagel replaced him before production began. Bela Lugosi took a break from Tod Browning's performing the play Dracula from June 23 to July 21 to appear in Tod Browning's The Thirteenth Chair as the film's inspector. Lugosi had replaced William "Stage" Boyd, which led to the characters name and being changed to Inspector Dezlante, to suit Lugosi's accent.

The script labelled as the "First Temporary Incomplete" script dated May 8, 1929, by Elliott Clawson changed the plays setting from New York to Calcutta, India. The film otherwise largely follows the story of the screenplay but changes who was the actual murderer. The film was set to start production on June 3, 1929, but only started on June 10. Rehearsals and shooting totalled to 36 days with principal photography being completed on July 15, 1929.  The Hollywood Filmograph reported Browing being in post-production and near completion of the film on August 10.

Release
The Thirteenth Chair was released on October 19, 1929. Shortly after this release, a silent version of the film was released. This was a regular occurrence during this period in film history as several film theatres were not equipped to show sound film. The silent version of the film is considered lost as of February 2021.

Reception
Historians Gary Rhodes and Bill Kaffenberger stated that contemporary response to the film was varied.  The Hollywood Filmograph stated that several scenes depended strictly on sound, "to which the audience did not react favorably." 

Among the positive reviews, The Education Screen stated the film was "tense and gripping murder mystery, skillfully picturized, well acted" and was "above average". Billboard declared it "rattling good entertainment" with Tod Browning "giving his better efforts, and leaves the picturegoer completely satisfied" A review in Variety found the ending weak, but stated the film should satisfying audiences.

Motion Picture News stated the film had "nothing outstanding to recommend it beyond capable direction of Tod Browning" Weekly Film Review declared that it "just misses being good entertainment" Harrison's Reports declared that the story was thing, and the action was slow-paced and the inter-woven romance was not interested and that only the seance and the disclosure of the real murderer held any attention.

See also
 Bela Lugosi filmography

References

Sources

External links

 
 
 
 

1929 films
1929 mystery films
American black-and-white films
American mystery films
Films directed by Tod Browning
Films set in country houses
Films set in India
Metro-Goldwyn-Mayer films
Transitional sound films
1920s English-language films
1920s American films